The gray-bellied caenolestid (Caenolestes caniventer), or grey-bellied shrew opossum, is a shrew opossum found in humid, temperate forests and moist grasslands of western Ecuador and northwestern Peru. It was first described by American zoologist Harold Elmer Anthony in 1921. Little is known about the behavior of the gray-bellied caenolestid. It appears to be terrestrial (land-living) and crepuscular (active around twilight) or nocturnal (active at night). Diet consists of invertebrate larvae, small vertebrates and plant material. The IUCN classifies the gray-bellied caenolestid as near threatened.

Taxonomy and etymology 
The gray-bellied caenolestid is one of the five members of Caenolestes, and is placed in the family Caenolestidae (shrew opossums). It was first described by American zoologist Harold Elmer Anthony in 1921. In the latter part of 20th century, scientists believed that Caenolestes is closely related to Lestoros (the Incan caenolestid). Over the years, it became clear that Lestoros is morphologically different from Caenolestes. A 2013 morphological and mitochondrial DNA-based phylogenetic study showed that the Incan caenolestid and the long-nosed caenolestid (Rhyncholestes raphanurus) form a clade sister to Caenolestes. The cladogram below is based on this study.

Caenolestid fossils date to as early as the early Eocene (nearly 55 mya). The generic name Caenolestes derives from the Greek words kainos ("new") and lestes ("robber", "pirate").

Ecology and behavior 
Little is known about the behavior of the gray-bellied caenolestid. It appears to be terrestrial (land-living) and crepuscular (active around twilight) or nocturnal (active at night). It appears to be an "opportunistic feeder". Analysis of stomach contents of individuals from Peru suggested a diet comprised largely (up to 75%) by invertebrate larvae (such as arachnids and centipedes); small vertebrates and plant material are also consumed. A pregnant female captured in Ecuador was found to have two fetuses in its womb.

Distribution and status 
It occurs in small tunnels under tree roots by streams. The range covers western Ecuador and northwestern Peru. The IUCN classifies the gray-bellied caenolestid as near threatened. Its population has decreased by nearly 20% since the 1990s; numbers are feared to be declining due to deforestation and agricultural expansion. The gray-bellied caenolestid occurs in Cajas National Park and Mazán Ecological Reserve.

References

External links 

Shrew opossums
Marsupials of South America
Mammals of Ecuador
Mammals of Peru
Near threatened animals
Near threatened biota of South America
Mammals described in 1921
Taxonomy articles created by Polbot

es:Caenolestes#Caenolestes caniventer